TRNA (guanine9-N1)-methyltransferase (Trm10p, tRNA(m1G9/m1A9)-methyltransferase, tRNA(m1G9/m1A9)MTase, tRNA (guanine-N(1)-)-methyltransferase, tRNA m1G9-methyltransferase, tRNA m1G9 MTase) is an enzyme with systematic name S-adenosyl-L-methionine:tRNA (guanine9-N1)-methyltransferase. This enzyme catalyses the following chemical reaction

 S-adenosyl-L-methionine + guanine9 in tRNA  S-adenosyl-L-homocysteine + N1-methylguanine9 in tRNA

The enzyme from Saccharomyces cerevisiae specifically methylates guanine9.

References

External links 
 

EC 2.1.1